Evocative/suppression testing refers to a class of tests performed where one substance is measured both before and after the administration of another substance to determine if the levels are stimulated ("evocative") or suppressed.

They are most commonly performed in the evaluation of possible endocrine disorders.

Certain tests are performed in the evaluation of multiple conditions, and not all listed substances may be measured in each test.

Examples include:

References

Endocrine procedures
Medical tests
Dynamic endocrine function tests